Elections were held in the organized municipalities in the Kenora District of Ontario on October 25, 2010 in conjunction with municipal elections across the province.

Dryden
Councillor Craig Nuttall defeated incumbent mayor Anne Krassilowsky in Dryden. Brian Collins, Mel Fisher, Mike Wood, Martin MacKinnon, Ken Moss and Mary Trist were elected to council.

Ear Falls
Kevin Kahoot was elected mayor of Ear Falls. He is the son of Bob Kahoot, a former mayor of Keewatin. Vic Robinson, Jim Desmarais, Rob Eady and Fred Melanson were elected to council.

Ignace
Lee Kennard was elected mayor of Ignace. Kim Crossley, Chicki Pesola, Larry Fraser and Alan Graver were elected to council.

Kenora
Incumbent mayor Len Compton did not run for re-election. Former mayor Dave Canfield, who was defeated by Compton in the 2006 municipal election, was re-elected as his successor. Ron Lunny, Sharon Smith, Rory McMillan, Rod McKay, Louis Roussin and Charito Drinkwater were elected to council.

Machin
Gord Dingman defeated incumbent mayor Garry Parkes in Machin. Gordon Griffiths, Ronald Kujansuu, Dennis Peterson and Joseph Ruete were elected to council.

Pickle Lake
Roy Hoffman defeated incumbent mayor Mike Shewan in Pickle Lake. Richard Dunbabin, Janice Pickett, Graham Vaughan and John White were elected to council.

Red Lake

Incumbent mayor Phil Vinet was acclaimed back into office in Red Lake. Debra Schushack, Ken Forsythe, Anne Billard, Paul Parsons, Jason Baker and Sandy Middleton were elected to council.

Sioux Lookout
Dennis Leney was elected mayor of Sioux Lookout. Donald Fenlon, Calvin Southall, John Bath, Doug Squires, Herb Zettel and Joyce Timpson were elected to council.

Sioux Narrows-Nestor Falls
Incumbent mayor Bill Thompson was acclaimed back into office in Sioux Narrows-Nestor Falls. Norbert Dufresne, Gale Black, Wayne Helliar and former mayor Jerry O'Leary will serve on council.

References

2010 Ontario municipal elections
Kenora District